Chara (alternatively Ciara or C’ara) is an Afro-Asiatic language of the North Omotic variety spoken in the Southern Nations, Nationalities, and People's Region of Ethiopia by 13,000 people.

Status
Chara is geographically situated to the southeast of Nayi, west of Kullo, northeast of Mesketo, and northwest of Gofa.
Chara speakers live in the Southern Nations, Nationalities, and People's Region, in the Debub Omo Zone, on both sides of the Omo river. Chara speakers are scattered in three villages in Ethiopia: Geba a meša, Buna Anta, and Kumba.  Native speakers may also speak Melo, Wolaytta (54% lexical similarity with Chara) to the east, and Kafa to the west.

Phonology

Consonants

[p] and [f] are in free variation. /ɗ/ only occurs in the word /jalɗa~jaltʼa/ 'crooked'. Yilma (2002) found /ɓ/ to occur five times in around 550 lexical items. He also found /ʑ/ occurring in two, both in the sequence /iʑa/. Occurrence of /ɗ/ and /pʼ/ may be governed by dialectal variation.

Vowels

/a/ is realized as [ə] in unstressed word-medial syllables.

Length is minimally contrastive. Minimal pairs include /mola/ 'fish', /moːla/ 'egg'; /masa/ 'to wash', /maːsa/ 'leopard'; /buna/ 'flower', /buːna/ 'coffee'.

Suprasegmentals
Chara has phonemic stress. Examples: /ˈbakʼa/ 'to slap', /baˈkʼa/ 'empty'; /ˈwoja/ 'to come', /woˈja/ 'wolf'.

Morphophonemics
Morpheme-initial nasals assimilate point of articulation to that of the preceding consonant, usually found when verbs are suffixed with the singular imperative morpheme /-na/, e.g. /dub-na/ 'to hit.imp' → [dubma] 'hit!'.

Grammar

Morphology
Chara generally uses noun case suffixes and postpositions.

Nouns are inflected for gender, number, definiteness, case, and possession. These are all suffixes, except for the possessive.

Gender pairs are usually lexical, except for a few with /-i/ in the masculine and /-a/ in the feminine. Examples:
/mansa/ 'ox', /mija/ 'cow'
/izi/ 'he', /iza/ 'she'

Nouns and adjectives inflect for plural with the suffix /-eːndi/. Examples:
/ina/ 'mother', /ineːndi/ 'mothers'
/dala/ 'while (sg.)', /daleːndi/ 'white (pl.)'

Definiteness in nouns is marked with the suffix /-naːzi/ (as an independent word meaning 'the male/man') for masculines and /-ena/ for feminines. Adjectives take /-bi/ in the masculine and /-ena/ in the feminine. Examples:
/mansa/ 'ox', /mansanaːzi/ 'the ox'
/mija/ 'cow', /mijena/ 'the cow/
/karta/ 'black', /kartabi/ 'the black (m.)', /kartena/ 'the black (f.)'

Nouns and adjectives may be marked for nominative, accusative, dative, genitive, ablative, instrumental, or vocative case. The nominative suffix is /-i/, accusative /-(i)s/, dative /-(i)ri/, genitive /-e/, ablative /-kaj/, instrumental /-ne/, and vocative /-o/.

Bound possessive pronouns: /ta-mija/ 'my cow', /ne-mija/ 'your cow', /iza-mija/ 'his cow'.

Syntax
Chara is a subject–object–verb language.

Adjectives end in /-a/ like nouns, and inflect for number, definiteness, plurality, and case. In noun phrases adjectives precede their nouns, and are not inflected.

Examples

Notes

References

Survey of Chara, Dime, Melo and Nayi, part 1. Yilma, Aklilu; Siebert, Ralph. 1995. S.L.L.E. linguistic reports 25: 2-8. oai:sil.org:36294

External links
Resources in and about the Chara language
Chara basic lexicon at the Global Lexicostatistical Database

North Omotic languages
Languages of Ethiopia